The half-Windsor knot, also known as the single Windsor knot, is a way of tying a necktie which produces a neat, triangular knot. It is larger than the four-in-hand knot and Pratt knot, but smaller than the Windsor knot. The half-Windsor is derived from the Windsor in that it is only brought up around the loop on one side rather than both. It works well with light- and medium-weight fabrics.

See also
Windsor knot – a substantially bulkier knot
Four-in-hand knot
List of knots

References

External links

Necktie knots